Gwer East is a Local Government Area of Benue State, Nigeria. Its headquarters is in the town of Aliade.
 
It has an area of 2,294 km and a population of 163,647 at the 2006 census.

The postal code of the area is 971.

The Local Government has three districts; Yonov, Njiriv and Ngyohov. It has 17 Council wards. It shares boundary with seven other local government areas.

References

Local Government Areas in Benue State